The 11th Politburo of the Communist Party of Vietnam (CPV), formally the 11th Political Bureau of the Central Committee of the Communist Party of Vietnam (Vietnamese: Bộ Chính trị Ban Chấp hành trung ương Đảng Cộng sản Việt Nam Khoá XI), was elected at the 1st Plenary Session of the 11th Central Committee in the immediate aftermath of the 11th National Congress. Of the 14 members of the 11th Politubro, five of them were new to the Politburo (Trần Đại Quang, Tòng Thị Phóng, Ngô Văn Dụ, Đinh Thế Huynh and Nguyễn Xuân Phúc). Nguyễn Phú Trọng was elected General Secretary of the Central Committee – as General Secretary he presides over the work of the Central Committee, the Secretariat and the Politburo.

The 11th Politburo, and in particular Prime Minister Nguyễn Tấn Dũng, the third ranked member, has been criticised over its handling of the Vietnamese economy. In the aftermath of the 6th plenum of the Central Committee (held 1–15 October 2012), Nguyễn Phú Trọng issued an official apology to the people of Vietnam, saying "The Politburo and Secretariat for many terms now have made some big mistakes, especially having not prevented and remedied corruption and the deterioration among some party members", further stating that "Some senior officials, those currently in office as well as former ones, have occasionally not been morally good role models through their lifestyles and those of their families. They have significantly impacted the prestige of the party and the state." He specified that the Central Committee choose not to dissolve the 14-member 11th Politburo, even if one of its members (later proven to be Nguyễn Tấn Dũng), "was deserving of punishment." Later, at a convocation of the National Assembly, Nguyễn Tấn Dũng apologised to the Vietnamese people; "I recognise my political responsibility and my faults" over his handling of the Vietnamese economy.

According to Tuong Vu, an associate professor at the University of Oregon, there exists a rivalry between Trương Tấn Sang, Nguyễn Phú Trọng, Nguyễn Sinh Hùng, the Chairman of the National Assembly, and others against Nguyễn Tấn Dũng and his supporters. According to several diplomats and Western academics, Trương Tấn Sang, during the run-up to the 11th National Congress, tried to supplant Nguyễn Tấn Dũng as prime minister. In this he failed, and he was instead appointed to the largely ceremonial post of President. One of the most outstanding critiques of Nguyễn Tấn Dũng's economic policy is his handling of the state-owned sector; state companies have preserved Soviet-like working ethics, together with large loans, and overextended growth led to a meltdown of two high-profile state-owned companies; both Vinashin and Vinalines both required government rescue. Nguyễn Tấn Dũng's has also been criticised by his handling of corruption; several corruption scandals became public during his first term as prime minister. Following the 6th plenum of the Central Committee, Nguyễn Phú Trọng said a vote of confidence would be introduced in 2013.

Two additional members were elected to the 11th Politburo at the 7th plenum of the 11th Central Committee on 11 May 2013.

Members

References

External links
 Chân dung 19 ủy viên Bộ Chính trị khóa XII

11th Politburo of the Communist Party of Vietnam